Dasylirion wheeleri (desert spoon, spoon flower, sotol, or common sotol) is a species of flowering plant in the asparagus family (Asparagaceae), native to arid environments of northern Mexico and the southwestern United States.

Description

The leaves radiate from the center of the plant's apex in all directions (spherical).

The stem is topped by a long plume of straw-colored small flowers about 2.5 cm long with six tepals. The color of the flower helps determine the gender of the plant, being mostly white for males and purple-pink for females.

Dasylirion leiophyllum is similar, but the toothed leaves curve towards the base.

Etymology
Dasylirion is a compound word from the Greek, literally meaning 'dense' or 'shaggy' + 'lily'. The Latin specific epithet wheeleri refers to the American surveyor and plant collector George Montague Wheeler (1842–1905).

Distribution and habitat
It is native to arid, rocky environments of northern Mexico, in Chihuahua and Sonora and in the southwestern United States, in the Sonoran Desert in Arizona, and also in New Mexico and western Texas.

Uses

D. wheeleri is grown as an ornamental plant, valued in xeriscaping. As it does not tolerate extended frosts, in temperate regions it is usually grown under glass. It has gained the Royal Horticultural Society's Award of Garden Merit.

The alcoholic drink sotol, the northern cousin to tequila and mezcal, is made from the fermented inner cores of the plant. It is the state drink of the Mexican states of Chihuahua, Durango, and Coahuila.

It was also used by the natives of the region for food and fiber. Its flower stalk can be used as a fire plow.

The Tarahumara and Pima Bajo peoples of the Sierra Madre Occidental of Chihuahua weave baskets from the leaves after they strip off the spines from the leaf margins. They also employ the expanded leaf bases in making large artificial flowers as holiday decorations.

References

External links
Flora of North America: Dasylirion wheeleri; Range Map
USDA Plant Profile: Dasylirion wheeleri
Pictures of Dasylirion wheeleri

wheeleri
Flora of Arizona
Flora of Chihuahua (state)
Flora of New Mexico
Flora of Sonora
Flora of the Sonoran Deserts
Flora of the Chihuahuan Desert
Garden plants of North America
Drought-tolerant plants